"Paper tiger" is a calque of the Chinese phrase zhǐlǎohǔ. The term refers to something or someone that claims or appears to be powerful or threatening, but is actually ineffectual and unable to withstand challenge.

The expression became well known internationally as a slogan used by Mao Zedong, former Chairman of the Chinese Communist Party and paramount leader of China, against his political opponents, particularly the United States. It has since been used in various capacities and variations to describe many other opponents and entities.

Origin
Zhilaohu is an ancient phrase. Robert Morrison, the British missionary and lexicographer, translated the phrase as "a paper tiger" in Vocabulary of the Canton Dialect in 1828. John Francis Davis translated the Chinese phrase as "paper tiger" in a book on Chinese history published in 1836. In a meeting with Henry Kissinger in 1973, Mao Zedong claimed in a humorous aside to have coined the English phrase, which provoked laughter all around.

Use
Mao Zedong first introduced his idea of paper tigers to Americans in an August 1946 interview with American journalist Anna Louise Strong:

In a 1956 interview with Strong, Mao used the phrase "paper tiger" to describe American imperialism again:

In 1957, Mao reminisced about the original interview with Strong:

In this view, "paper tigers" are superficially powerful but are prone to overextension that leads to sudden collapse. When Mao criticized Soviet appeasement of the United States during the Sino-Soviet split, Soviet Premier Nikita Khrushchev reportedly said, "the paper tiger has nuclear teeth".

Other uses
In The Resistance to Theory (1982), Paul de Man used the phrase to reflect upon the threat of literary theory to traditional literary scholarship in American academia. He said, "If a cat is called a tiger it can easily be dismissed as a paper tiger; the question remains however why one was so scared of the cat in the first place".

Osama bin Laden described U.S. soldiers as "paper tigers". This statement may reflect the influence of Maoism on the formation of the Taliban.

The phrase was used in a 2006 speech by then-Senator Joe Biden to describe North Korea after a series of missile launches from the country that same year, defying the warnings of the international community while still incapable of directly harming the United States.

China itself has been called a paper tiger. In 2021, Tufts University professor Michael Beckley argued in his book Unrivaled: Why America Will Remain the World’s Sole Superpower that China would not be able to overtake the United States, and that believing China is stronger than it really is, is detrimental to American perceptions and policy. According to Beckley, this is because "China’s economic, financial, technological, and military strength is hugely exaggerated by crude and inaccurate statistics": for example, Beckley states that high-scoring Chinese education statistics are actually cherry picked, that the People's Liberation Army is not as strong as the United States Armed Forces due to their differing focuses, and that China's large GDP does not equate to their actual strength or power.

Following the 2022 Russian invasion of Ukraine, the Russian Armed Forces was described by many commentators as a paper tiger. Steve Day, a retired Canadian Armed Forces Joint Task Force 2 commander, described Russian command and control as "utterly inept" and suggested that the Russian military "may not be as invincible as we've believed for a number of decades". Warrior Maven and 19FortyFive noted that newly-developed Russian technologies such as the Sukhoi Su-57 and hypersonic missiles were not deployed during the conflict; the former argued that despite Vladimir Putin making "a public spectacle of what he claims are his country’s now operational hypersonic weapons, and state-owned Russian media reports consistently tout new military technologies, tests and progress", these new technologies are only deployed in small numbers, so it is likely that Russia's "integrated ground combat abilities, long thought to be exemplary, have been massively overestimated". The New Yorker noted that during the 2008 Russo-Georgian War, the Russian military suffered from "disunity of command; logistical weaknesses; poorly trained, poorly motivated, poorly led troops; very poor quality of officer corps; very poor quality of campaign design and ability to plan", as well as "very poor integration within and among the armed services, including the synchronization of air and ground operations".

See also
 Straw dog
 China's final warning
 Russia

References

Anti-American sentiment in China
Chinglish
Political catchphrases
Political metaphors
Mao Zedong
Metaphors referring to tigers